Ganjali (also Romanized as Ganj‘alī; also known as Ganj ‘Alīābād-e ‘Olyā) is a village in Boluran Rural District, Darb-e Gonbad District, Kuhdasht County, Lorestan Province, Iran. At the 2006 census, its population was 76, in 17 families.

References 

Towns and villages in Kuhdasht County